Benny Turner (born October 27, 1939) is an American blues musician. He is the younger brother of Freddie King and was the bass guitarist for the Freddie King Band. Later, Turner joined Mighty Joe Young as the bass guitarist of his band before becoming the bandleader for Marva Wright for 20 years. After many years as a sideman, Turner started his solo career.

Early Years 
Turner was born in Gilmer, Texas on October 27, 1939. He and his older brother Freddie King learned how to play guitar from their mother, Ella Mae (King) Turner, and her brothers Leon and Leonard King. In the 1950s, Turner moved to Chicago with his family.

Career
Turner started his music career playing guitar for The Kindly Shepherds, a gospel group on the Nashboro Records label. He joined the group on several recordings, playing guitar and accompanying background vocals. At the time, Turner also started playing with his brother at Chicago clubs such as the Squeeze Club and Walton's Corner, where he met Dee Clark and was invited to join him and his R&B band on the road.

Later, Turner would play bass for The Soul Stirrers. He eventually rejoined his brother's band and toured regularly, performing with musicians such as Eric Clapton, John Fogerty and Grand Funk Railroad. While at the Montreux Jazz Festival in 1973, members of Freddie's band were asked to sit in with Memphis Slim, and Turner played bass on the recording of "Memphis Slim – Very Much Alive and in Montreux."

Following the death of Freddie King in 1976, Turner became deeply depressed and was hospitalized. After two years of seclusion, he was convinced to start performing again and joined Mighty Joe Young's band, which he played in for eight years. During that time, Turner and Young appeared in the 1981 film Thief while playing live at the Wise Fools Pub in Chicago. Later, Turner moved to New Orleans and became the bandleader for Marva Wright in 1986, playing with her band for 20 years.

After Wright's death in 2010, Turner went on to release four albums including his critically acclaimed 2014 album of original work called Journey. He also rejoined other members of the original Freddie King band for a brief tour celebrating King's 80th birthday. His 2016 album When She's Gone was dedicated to his mother Ella Mae and featured a collection of six original reissues from his album, Blue and Not So Blue, and four blues standards. His autobiography, Survivor : The Benny Turner Story, was published on July 8, 2017.  Also in 2017, Turner released his latest album, My Brother's Blues. This award-winning album is a tribute to big brother Freddie King and features 11 tunes from Freddie's songbook that are of special significance to Benny.  In 2019, Turner  joined forces with longtime friend and fellow Chicago musician Cash McCall to record Going Back Home, revisiting their days of playing on Chicago's South and West Sides.

On October 27, 2019, Turner celebrated his 80th birthday at the Inaugural Lone Star Blues and Heritage Festival in Grapeland, Texas.  Governor Greg Abbott of Texas officially recognized this milestone and Turner's many contributions to music and music history.

Awards and accolades 

 2014 Offbeat Best of the Beat Awards - Nominee for Best Blues Album - Journey
 2015 International Songwriting Competition - Finalist for Blues Song - Breakin' News
 2016 Blues Blast Music Awards - Nominee for Soul Blues Album - When She's Gone
 2016 Independent Blues Awards Awards - Nominee for Best Traditional Blues CD - When She's Gone 
 15th Independent Music Awards - Winner for Blues Song - I Can't Leave
 16th Independent Music Awards - Nominee for Tribute CD - My Brother's Blues
17th Independent Music Awards - Nominee for Blues Album - Going Back Home
 2018 Global Music Awards - Silver Medal for Outstanding Achievement - My Brother's Blues
 Turner received the 2017 Jus Blues Music Foundation "Little Milton Lifetime Bluesman Award"
 Turner was inducted into the Chicago Blues Hall of Fame in 2017
 October 27, 2017 was named "Benny Turner Day" in Gilmer, TX by proclamation of Mayor Tim Marshall
 Turner was a nominee in the 39th Blues Music Awards in the Instrumentalist-Bass category
2018 Blues Blast Music Awards - Nominee for Male Blues Artist of the Year and Soul Blues Album-My Brother's Blues
2018 Independent Blues Awards - Winner for Best Traditional Blues Band
2018 International Songwriting Competition - Finalist for Blues Song - What's Wrong With The World Today
25th Living Blues Awards, Critics' Poll - Winner for Most Outstanding Musician (Bass)
26th Living Blues Awards, Critics' Poll - Winner for Most Outstanding Musician (Bass)
2019 Blues Blast Music Awards - Nominee for Traditional Blues Album - Going Back Home
2019 Independent Blues Awards - Nominee for Best Traditional Blues CD - Going Back Home

Discography

References

Living people
American blues musicians
Texas blues musicians
Chicago blues musicians
African-American guitarists
20th-century American guitarists
American blues guitarists
American male guitarists
Guitarists from Illinois
Guitarists from Texas
People from Gilmer, Texas
1939 births
20th-century American male musicians
One-derful Records artists
20th-century African-American musicians
21st-century African-American people